John Leonard Nordlander (1894–1961) was a Swedish sea captain and Commander commissioned by the shipping line Swedish American Line, crossing the Atlantic Ocean 532 times.

Biography
John Nordlander was born in 1894 in Härnösand, Västernorrland County, Sweden, to a family of seafarers, and was educated there as a captain.

Initially serving in the Swedish Navy and aboard international sailing ships, Nordlander was first educated as a First Officer in Härnösand and then as a Captain at the Marine Officer's School of Gothenburg.

Nordlander died in 1961 in Gothenburg and was buried there at Östra kyrkogården.

Swedish American Line

Nordlander was commissioned by the Swedish American Line in 1920 and subsequently served as naval officer on all its ships on transatlantic cruises as well as in other directions, including the West Indies. Ships that Nordlander commanded include:
  (1941, 1942, 1947), as John Ericsson (1947)
 
  (1942–1948)
 MS Stockholm (1948–1953, 1954), later renamed MV Astoria
  Flagship 1953–1954, 1955–1957

Besides his war activities, later in his career Nordlander was also directed other rescue missions. Among these were the 1950 incident of the Norwegian ship Crown Prince Olav which caught fire off Halland, on the west coast of Sweden. Despite no visibility due to heavy fog, helped only by radar, Nordlander managed to find and tow the deteriorating ship and her 120 passengers safely to the nearest port. In 1955, Nordlander rescued the British   which caught fire off Ireland.

World War II
Nordlander served throughout World War II.

US ship requisition in New York
In 1942 after the USA entered World War II, commanded by Nordlander, was seized at New York City, compulsorily purchased by the United States government for the War Shipping Administration, converted into a troop ship and registered under the US flag.

Allied prisoner exchanges and rescue missions

After the purchase of his former ship, Nordlander was appointed Master of  1942–1948, carrying out several prisoner transport missions, totalling thousands of displaced victims and prisoners of war, notably in collaboration with the Red Cross. Under signs such as "Freigeleit – Protected, Drottningholm Sweden", she was one of the few ships that sailed hostile waters with all lights shining at night.

In 1942 Drottningholms sides were marked "Diplomat – Drottningholm Sverige" when carrying disabled prisoners of war, victims of Nazi concentration camps and diplomats from Liverpool, United Kingdom, to North America.

In September 1944 she was deployed by the Red Cross to transport prisoners of war and civilians being repatriated from Nazi Germany to the United Kingdom via Sweden.

Another voyage in April 1945 docked in Liverpool that included 212 ex-interned Channel Islanders. One of the voyages is indicated to have safely relocated 1,362 individuals at once.

In popular culture
In tribute to the vessel under Nordlander's command, a short illustrated movie, The S.S. Drottningholm (2014), was produced by Molly DeVries about her ancestors, the Jewish-American concert pianist Walter Hautzig and writer Esther Hautzig. The two belonged to and met among the thousands of passengers on rescue missions aboard Drottningholm, and later got married.

Distinctions
 Sweden: Knight 1st Class of the Order of Vasa (1945)
 Denmark: Knight of the Order of the Dannebrog
 Finland: Order of the Lion of Finland
 United Kingdom: Sea Gallantry Medal in Silver for Saving Life at Sea (1956) by Queen Elizabeth II for the rescue mission of Argobeam
 United States: World War II Victory Medal
 Sweden: Emmery Medal of the Royal Patriotic Society
 Delaware: Medal of Delaware
 Sweden: Medal of Merit Plaque of the Swedish Sea Rescue Society
 Sweden: Medal of Merit of the Red Cross in Sweden, conferred by King Gustaf V for his "humanitarian efforts during SS Drottningholm's transports during wartime"
 Cuba: Order of Merit and Honour of the Cuban Red Cross

References

External links

Videos 
 Swedish ship Drottningholm arrives in US with diplomatic officers leaving Axis nations (1942) (The March of Time), Steven Spielberg Jewish Film Archive, United States Holocaust Memorial Museum
 Refugee ship Drottningholm arrives (1942) (Associated Press Archive)
 Former US Diplomats From Europe Brought to New York on Ocean Liner (1942), Getty Images
 Ship launching at Swedish Harbor; Red Cross Ships with POWS (1944) (The March of Time), Steven Spielberg Jewish Film Archive, United States Holocaust Memorial Museum
 Hospital Ship 'Drottningholm' (1944), Liverpool, Merseyside, United Kingdom
 Semester på Atlanten (1954) aboard  (English translation: "Vacation on the Atlantic"), Filmarkivet, Swedish Film Institute (figuring Captain John Nordlander at 12.00 onwards)
 The S.S. Drottningholm (2014), a short illustrated movie by Molly DeVries about Jewish-American concert pianist Walter Hautzig and writer Esther Hautzig, who met at a rescue mission aboard SS Drottningholm and later eventually married

Images
 "Princess Sibylla, Crown Prince Carl Gustaf and the royal princesses being greeted on board by Captain John Nordlander" (1953), Library of Congress

1894 births
1961 deaths
People from Härnösand
19th-century Swedish people
20th-century Swedish people
Swedish sailors
Sea captains
Swedish people of World War II
Swedish humanitarians
Red Cross personnel
Knights First Class of the Order of Vasa
Knights of the Order of the Dannebrog
Recipients of the Sea Gallantry Medal